The Ford Police Interceptor is a range of automobiles manufactured by Ford. First used in 1992, the range consists of existing Ford models modified and sold for use as police cars and other car-based emergency vehicles.

Though Ford has historically produced police variants of their full-size Ford sedans, the "Police Interceptor" name originated with the Ford Crown Victoria Police Interceptor in 1992. As of 2022, the only Police Interceptor in production is the Ford Police Interceptor Utility, a variant of the Ford Explorer.

A similar nameplate, the Ford Police Responder, was introduced in the mid-2010s, consisting of special-duty police vehicles not intended to be used as frontline patrol vehicles.

Background 
Ford vehicles have been popular with police departments since the company's infancy, and Ford often sold directly to police departments; however, these did not use the "Interceptor" name. In 1951, Ford named the optional flathead V-8 for the 1951 Ford the "Interceptor"; this engine was available in the model's Police Package. The practice of naming Ford's Police Package motors "Interceptor" continued through the 1950s. The Ford LTD Crown Victoria, produced from 1979 to 1991, used the "P72" production code designation for fleet models. However, none used the name "Police Interceptor".

Crown Victoria (1992–2011) 

The Ford Crown Victoria Police Interceptor (CVPI) was the first Ford vehicle to use the "Police Interceptor" name.

Based on the Ford Crown Victoria, the first units were released in 1992, with a 4.6-liter Modular V8 engine and either a Ford AOD/AOD-E or Ford 4R70W 4-speed automatic transmission.

For almost the entirety of its first generation production, from 1992 to 1997, the CVPI closely resembled the civilian market Crown Victoria, including its 1995 facelift.

In 1998, the CVPI received a second generation redesign alongside the civilian Crown Victoria. Though the second generation CVPI initially continued to closely resemble its civilian market version, significant model redesigns in the early 2000s, including the removal of chrome trim and the replacement of its civilian slatted grille in favor of a unique honeycomb grille, gave the CVPI an increasingly distinct appearance. To continue to provide a civilian appearance for unmarked police cars, the "Street Appearance Package" was introduced as an option, designed to closely resemble the civilian Crown Victoria. When the Ford Crown Victoria was discontinued in the civilian market in 2008, the CVPI remained in production.

2011 was the final model year for the CVPI. The last CVPI was sold to the Kansas Highway Patrol, which they outfitted as a retro style parade car. To replace the CVPI, Ford introduced police variants of the sixth generation Taurus and the fifth and sixth generation Ford Explorer in 2012 for the 2013 model year. The names for both cars were the Ford Police Interceptor Sedan and Ford Police Interceptor Utility, respectively.

Taurus (2012–2019) 

The Ford Police Interceptor Sedan (FPIS) was introduced as the sedan of the Ford Police Interceptor range.

The Sedan's standard engine is a naturally-aspirated 3.5L V6 engine, shared with the regular Taurus. A 3.7-liter aluminum-block V6 engine, shared with the Ford Mustang, became available shortly after as an upgrade. Ford also offered an EcoBoost version, the SHO's 3.5-liter V6 which produces . All versions came with all-wheel drive, however, it could be deleted in favor of front wheel drive on the naturally-aspirated 3.5L version. In 2014, Ford began offering the 4-cylinder engine from its civilian counterpart in the FPIS as part of a Special Service trim designed for detective and administrative uses. The FPIS was available with newer Ford safety technology such as the Blind Spot Information System, rear view camera, reverse sensing system, and electronic stability control.

In 2015, Ford considered ending production of the Taurus in the United States. However, the FPIS was a major reason for continuing production.

In 2018, Ford announced that it would be ending production of the Ford Taurus sedan on which the FPIS was based. In March 2019, both the Taurus and FPIS were discontinued. The FPIS was replaced by the Ford Police Interceptor Utility and the Ford Police Responder Hybrid Sedan.

Explorer (2012–present) 

Although Ford initially offered a police package of the Explorer starting in 1993, The Ford Police Interceptor Utility (FPIU) nameplate was introduced as the SUV of the Ford Police Interceptor range in 2012.

The FPIU used the EcoBoost engine from the SHO in 2014, producing . It comes with an all-wheel drive powertrain, larger brake rotors, advanced ABS and traction control systems, a more efficient cooling system, emergency equipment fitments, and other standard equipment. To free up interior space on the center console for equipment, the transmission is fitted with a column-mounted shifter. Other fleet-specific options are also included.

In 2019, for the 2020 model year, the second generation FPIU was introduced with a new rear wheel drive platform, based on the sixth-generation Ford Explorer. With the discontinuation of the FPIS in 2019, the FPIU is the only vehicle produced under the Ford Police Interceptor name.

Ford Police Responder 
The Ford Police Responder is a nameplate used by Ford, applied to Ford police vehicles that are not intended to be used in situations that are more suited for the Ford Police Interceptor range, such as highway patrol. It is often used alongside their "Special Service Vehicle" (SSV) designation, used for support-oriented vehicles that are designed for specific applications (such as prisoner transport or off-roading) or are not intended to take part in pursuits.

Ford Police Responder Hybrid Sedan 

The Ford Police Responder Hybrid Sedan (FPRHS) was introduced for the 2019 model year, based on the second generation Ford Fusion Hybrid. Unlike the Ford Police Interceptor range, the FPRHS was intended for urban police departments that are less likely to be involved in high speed collisions compared to highway patrol. The FPRHS is the first pursuit-rated hybrid electric vehicle. 

Reception to the FPRHS were mixed; the Salt Lake City Police Department purchased 110 units, but controversy arose when officers complained about its "unsafe" cramped seating space and lack of all-wheel drive capabilities. However, Police Departments in bigger cities like the New York Police Department (NYPD) have favored the FPRHS for the fuel efficiency it provides as well as the vehicle’s light and easy handling through heavy traffic. The FPRHS was discontinued alongside the Ford Fusion in 2020.

Popularity 
While all of the Big Three automakers have offered police vehicles and had market shares proportionate to their overall market share, since the late 1990s Ford has had a near-monopoly on such vehicles in the United States, following General Motors discontinuing the B platform in 1996 and Chrysler discontinuing the M body vehicles in 1989. While GM (through Chevrolet) and Chrysler (through Dodge) continued to offer police vehicles after ending production of their last non-truck body on frame vehicles and continue to do so today (Dodge as part of Chrysler successor Stellantis), many police forces continued to order from Ford due to their commitment to traditional body on frame construction and its ease of maintenance as opposed to vehicles with unibody construction. By the time Ford retired the Panther platform in 2011 without a body-on-frame replacement, they had gained such a significant market share from law enforcement that they continued to order from Ford out of brand loyalty. Additionally, foreign automakers with major North American operations such as Toyota have never offered police vehicles in the United States.

Though mostly intended for use in North America, the Ford Police Interceptor line has seen popular use in Europe and the Middle East, despite the Ford Police Interceptor range not being offered in those regions.

See also 

 9C1 (Chevrolet Police package)

References 

Police vehicles
Ford vehicles
Emergency vehicles
Cars introduced in 1992